Have Faith  is an American sitcom that aired on ABC for 7 episodes in 1989.

Plot
The story of a Catholic parish in a less-than-desirable Chicago neighborhood.

Cast and characters
 Ron Carey as Father Vincent Paglia
 Stephen Furst as Father Gabriel "Gabe" Podmaninski
 Frank Hamilton as Father Edgar Tuttle
 Joel Higgins as Monsignor Joseph "Mac" MacKenzie
 Francesca P. Roberts as Sally Coleman
 Todd Susman as Arthur Glass

Episodes

References

External links
 

1980s American sitcoms
1989 American television series debuts
1989 American television series endings
American Broadcasting Company original programming
English-language television shows
Religious comedy television series
Television shows set in Chicago
Television series by 20th Century Fox Television